The Deanery of Alresford lies within the Diocese of Winchester in England.

It includes the parishes of Cliddesden, Dummer, Itchen Abbas, Martyr Worthy, New Alresford and Old Alresford.

External links 
Deanery website

Diocese of Winchester
Geography of Hampshire
Deaneries of the Church of England